Enrique Bertolino (3 November 1912 – 1997) is an Argentine professional golfer.

Bertolino turned professional in 1932, and competed in Europe in 1939, 1954 and 1956; and on the PGA Tour in 1940, 1947 and 1948. His best finish on the PGA Tour was 15th place in the Bing Crosby Pro-Am in 1948. In 1956, he was 6th in the British Open. In 1940, along with Martin Pose, he was the first Argentine player to compete in the Masters Tournament. He also played in the U.S. Open the same year.

Bertolino won the Argentine Open in 1945 and 1947, and was second in 1934, 1941 and 1950. He also won the Argentine PGA Championship in 1933, 1935, and 1939, and was second in 1932, 1938 and 1942. In 1937, he won an exhibition match against Byron Nelson in Buenos Aires, and in 1939, along with Juan Martínez, won an exhibition match in Scotland against Jimmy Adams and Jack McLean 3–0, one foursomes match and two individual matches.

Professional wins (21)

Argentine wins (18)
1933 Argentine PGA Championship
1935 Argentine PGA Championship
1939 Argentine PGA Championship
1943 Abierto del Litoral
1944 South Open
1945 South Open
1947 Argentine Open
1949 Center Open
1951 South Open, Center Open
1953 Abierto del Litoral, South Open
1955 Argentine Open, Metropolitano Open
1956 South Open, Municipal Championship
1959 Center Open
1960 South Open

Other wins (3)
1944 Montevideo Open (Uruguay)
1946 Chile Open (tie with Roberto De Vicenzo)
1950 Montevideo Open (Uruguay)

Team appearances
Great Britain–Argentina Professional Match (representing Argentina): 1939
World Cup (representing Argentina): 1956

References

Argentine male golfers
1912 births
1997 deaths